Mamaye Fousseyni Coulibaly (born 13 December 1999) is a Malian footballer who plays as a winger for Stade Malien and the Mali national team.

International career
Coulibaly made his professional debut with the Mali national team in a 0–0 2020 African Nations Championship qualification tie with Mauritania on 21 September 2019.

References

External links
 
 

1999 births
Living people
People from Kayes
Malian footballers
Mali international footballers
Association football wingers
Stade Malien players
FC Dila Gori players
Malian Première Division players
Malian expatriate footballers
Malian expatriate sportspeople in Georgia (country)
Expatriate footballers in Georgia (country)
21st-century Malian people
Mali A' international footballers
2020 African Nations Championship players